Raymond Mickey McDonald (born June 2, 1995) is an American professional baseball outfielder in the Oakland Athletics organization.

Early life and college career
McDonald attended Junípero Serra High School, and played college baseball for the UIC Flames.

Professional career

Draft and minor leagues
McDonald was drafted by the Oakland Athletics in the 18th round of the 2017 Major League Baseball draft. He played in 36 games during his first professional season, splitting time between the AZL Athletics and the Low-A Vermont Lake Monsters. In 2018, McDonald spent the year with the Single-A Beloit Snappers, slashing .284/.356/.353 with 2 home runs and 25 RBI in 110 games for the team. He appeared in 110 games again in 2019, splitting the season between the High-A Stockton Ports and the Double-A Midland RockHounds and hitting .235/.318/.289. McDonald did not play in a game in 2020 due to the cancellation of the minor league season because of the COVID-19 pandemic. McDonald spent the 2021 campaign split between Midland and the Triple-A Las Vegas Aviators, posting a .305/.402/.390 slash with 2 home runs and a career-high 38 RBI in 106 games between the two teams. He was assigned to Triple-A Las Vegas to begin the 2022 season.

Oakland Athletics (2022)
On April 20, 2022, McDonald was selected to the 40-man roster and promoted to the major leagues for the first time. He made his MLB debut that day at Oakland Coliseum, appearing as a pinch hitter in the ninth inning against the Baltimore Orioles. McDonald appeared in four major league games, going 0-for-4 with 2 walks and 3 strikeouts before he was optioned back to Triple-A on April 29. He was designated for assignment the next day following the waiver claim of Domingo Tapia and was outrighted on May 2.

References

External links

1995 births
Living people
Arizona League Athletics players
Baseball players from California
Beloit Snappers players
Las Vegas Aviators players
Major League Baseball outfielders
Midland RockHounds players
Oakland Athletics players
People from San Mateo, California
Stockton Ports players
Vermont Lake Monsters players
UIC Flames baseball players
Eau Claire Express players